Homaloxestis cicatrix is a moth in the family Lecithoceridae. It was described by László Anthony Gozmány in 1973. It is found in Nepal, northern Vietnam and China (Jiangxi, Hainan).

References

Moths described in 1973
Homaloxestis
Moths of Asia